A sink is a bowl-shaped plumbing fixture for washing hands, dishwashing, and other purposes. Sinks have a tap (faucet) that supply hot and cold water and may include a spray feature to be used for faster rinsing. They also include a drain to remove used water; this drain may itself include a strainer and/or shut-off device and an overflow-prevention device. Sinks may also have an integrated soap dispenser. Many sinks, especially in kitchens, are installed adjacent to or inside a counter.

When a sink becomes clogged, a person will often resort to using a chemical drain cleaner or a plunger, though most professional plumbers will remove the clog with a drain auger (often called a "plumber's snake").

History

United States
The washstand was a bathroom sink made in the United States in the late 18th century. The washstands were small tables on which were placed a pitcher and a deep bowl, following the English tradition. Sometimes the table had a hole where the large bowl rested, which led to the making of dry sinks. From about 1820 to 1900, the dry sink evolved by the addition of a wooden cabinet with a trough built on the top, lined with zinc or lead. This is where the bowls or buckets for water were kept. Splashboards were sometimes added to the back wall, as well as shelves and drawers, the more elaborate designs usually placed in the kitchen.

Materials 
Sinks are made of many different materials. These include:

 Ceramic
 Concrete
 Copper
 Enamel over steel or cast iron
 Glass
 Granite
 Marble
 Nickel
 Plastic
 Polyester
 Porcelain
 Soapstone
 Stainless steel
 Stone
 Terrazzo
 Wood

Stainless steel is most commonly used in kitchens and commercial applications because it represents a good trade-off between cost, usability, durability, and ease of cleaning. Most stainless steel sinks are made by drawing a sheet of stainless steel over a die. Some very deep sinks are fabricated by welding. Stainless steel sinks will not be damaged by hot or cold objects and resist damage from impacts. One disadvantage of stainless steel is that, being made of thin metal, they tend to be noisier than most other sink materials, although better sinks apply a heavy coating of vibration-damping material to the underside of the sink.

Enamel over cast iron is a popular material for kitchen and bathroom sinks. Heavy and durable, these sinks can also be manufactured in a very wide range of shapes and colors. Like stainless steel, they are very resistant to hot or cold objects, but they can be damaged by sharp impacts and once the glass surface is breached, the underlying cast iron will often corrode, spalling off more of the glass. Aggressive cleaning will dull the surface, leading to more dirt accumulation. Enamel over steel is a similar-appearing but far less rugged and less cost-effective alternative.

Solid ceramic sinks have many of the same characteristics as enamel over cast iron, but without the risk of surface damage leading to corrosion.

Plastic sinks come in several basic forms:
 Inexpensive sinks are simply made using injection-molded thermoplastics. These are often deep, free-standing sinks used in laundry rooms. Subject to damage by hot or sharp objects, the principal virtue of these sinks is their low cost.
 High-end acrylic drop-in (lowered into the countertop) and undermount (attached from the bottom) sinks are becoming more popular, although they tend to be easily damaged by hard objects – like scouring a cast iron frying pan in the sink.
 Plastic sinks may also be made from the same materials used to form "solid surface" countertops. These sinks are durable, attractive, and can often be molded with an integrated countertop or joined to a separate countertop in a seamless fashion, leading to no sink-to-countertop joint or a very smooth sink-to-countertop joint that can not trap dirt or germs. These sinks are subject to damage by hot objects but damaged areas can sometimes be sanded down to expose undamaged material.

Soapstone sinks were once common, but today tend to be used only in very-high-end applications or applications that must resist caustic chemicals that would damage more-conventional sinks.

Wood sinks are from the early days of sinks, and baths were made from natural teak with no additional finishing. Teak is chosen because of its natural waterproofing properties – it has been used for hundreds of years in the marine industry for this reason. Teak also has natural antiseptic properties, which is a bonus for its use in baths and sinks.

Glass sinks: A current trend in bathroom design is the handmade glass sink (often referred to as a vessel sink), which has become fashionable for wealthy homeowners.

Stone sinks have been used for ages. Some of the more popular stones used are: marble, travertine, onyx, granite, and soap stone on high end sinks.

Glass, concrete, and terrazzo sinks are usually designed for their aesthetic appeal and can be obtained in a wide variety of unusual shapes and colors such as floral shapes. Concrete and terrazzo are occasionally also used in very-heavy-duty applications such as janitorial sinks.

Styles

Top-mount sinks
Self-rimming (top-mount) sinks sit in appropriately shaped holes roughly cut in the countertop (or substrate material) using a jigsaw or other cutter appropriate to the material at hand. They are suspended by their rim which forms a fairly close seal with the top surface of the worktop. If necessary, this seal can be enhanced by clamping the sink from below the worktop.

Bottom-mount sinks

Bottom-mount or under-mount sinks are installed below the countertop surface. The edge of the countertop material is exposed at the hole created for the sink (and so must be a carefully finished edge rather than a rough cut). The sink is then clamped to the bottom of the material from below. Especially for bottom-mount sinks, silicone-based sealants are usually used to assure a waterproof joint between the sink and the countertop material. Advantages of an undermount sink include superior ergonomics and a contemporary look; disadvantages include extra cost in both the sink and the counter top. Also, no matter how carefully the cut out is made, the result is either a small ledge or overhang at the interface with the sink. This can create an environment for catching dirt and allowing germs to grow.

Solid-surface plastic materials allow sinks to be made of the same plastic material as the countertop. These sinks can then easily be glued to the underside of the countertop material and the joint sanded flat, creating the usual invisible joint and completely eliminating any dirt-catching seam between the sink and the countertop. In a similar fashion, for stainless steel, a sink may be welded into the countertop; the joint is then ground to create a finished, concealed appearance.

Butler's sink
A butler's sink is a rectangular ceramic sink with a rounded rim which is set into a work surface. There are generally two kinds of butler's sinks: the London sink and the Belfast sink. London sinks were originally shallower than Belfast sinks. Some believe this was because London had less access to fresh water (and thus a greater need to conserve water), but this theory is now contested. It is more likely the two sinks had different roles within the household. But that difference usually does not exist in the modern era, and both sinks are now shallow. The primary difference both in the past and today between a Belfast and London sink is that the Belfast sink is fitted with an overflow weir which prevented water from spilling over the sink's edge by draining it away and down into the wastewater plumbing.

Farmer's sink

A farmer's sink is a deep sink that has a finished front. Set onto a countertop, the finished front of the sink remains exposed. This style of sink requires very little "reach-over" to access the sink.

Vessel sink

A vessel sink is a free-standing sink, generally finished and decorated on all sides, that sits directly on the surface of the furniture on which it is mounted. These sinks have become increasingly popular with bathroom designers because of the large range of materials, styles, and finishes that can be shown to good advantage.

Food catering sinks
Catering sinks are often made in sizes compatible with standard size Gastronorm containers, a European standard for food containers.

Ceramic basin construction
Pottery is made by a blend of clays, fillers and fluxes being fused together during the firing process. There are high fire clays and glazes which are heated to over 1200 °C (2200 °F) and are extremely resistant to fading, staining, burning, scratching and acid attack. Low fire clays, fired below 1200 °C, most often used by large commercial manufacturers and third world producers, while durable, are susceptible to scratching and wear over time. The clay body is first bisqued to about 1000 °C (1900 °F). In the second firing a white or coloured glaze is applied and is melted by heat which chemically and physically fuses the glass (glaze) to the clay body during the same firing process. Due to the firing process and natural clays used, it is normal for the product to vary in size and shape, and +/− 5 mm is normal.

Accessories
Some public restrooms feature automatic faucets, which use a motion-sensing valve to detect the user's hands moving beneath the tap and turn the water on. Some kitchen sinks also come equipped with a sink sprayer.

Sinks, especially those made of stainless steel, can be fitted with an integrated drainboard, allowing for the draining of washed dishes.

Gallery
There are many different shapes and sizes of sinks.

See also
 Dipper well
 Domestic water system
 Floor plan
 Garbage disposal
 Lavabo
 Proverbial kitchen sink
 Trap (plumbing)

References

Bibliography
 
 Fletcher, Banister Flight, Sir. Architectural Hygiene. London: Sir I. Pitman & Sons, 1921.

External links 
 
 

Plumbing
Kitchen
Bathrooms